Megachile dupla is a species of bee in the family Megachilidae. It was described by Ritsema in 1880.

References

Dupla
Insects described in 1880